The Central Interstate League was an independent minor league baseball league that operated from 1888 to 1890.

William H. Allen (1888), Henderson Ridgely (1889), E.T. McNeally (1890) and Fitzpatrick (1890) served as the league presidents. 

The 1888 Davenport Hawkeyes, 1889 Quincy Ravens and 1890 Evansville Hoosiers won league championships. The league permanently folded following the 1890 season.

Cities represented 
Bloomington, IL: Bloomington Reds 1888 
Burlington, IA: Burlington Babies 1889; Burlington Hawkeyes 1890 
Crawfordsville, IN: Crawfordsville Hoosiers 1888
Danville, IL: Danville Browns 1888 
Davenport, IA: Davenport Hawkeyes 1888–1889 
Decatur, IL: Decatur 1888 
Dubuque, IA: Dubuque 1888 
Evansville, IN: Evansville Hoosiers 1889–1890 
Galesburg, IL: Galesburg Pavers 1890 
Indianapolis, IN: Indianapolis 1890 
Lafayette, IN: Lafayette 1888 
Peoria, IL: Peoria Reds 1888; Peoria Canaries 1889–1890 
Quincy, IL: Quincy Ravens 1889–1890 
Rockford, IL: Rockford Rox 1888 
Springfield, IL: Springfield Senators 1889 
Terre Haute, IN: Terre Haute Hoosiers 1888, 1890

Standings & statistics

1888 Central Interstate League
Decatur (6–23) transferred to Lafayette June 13.; Rockford disbanded June 26.; Crawfordsville (21–21) transferred to Terre Haute July 2; Danville disbanded Jul 5; Lafayette and Dubuque disbanded July 9. The league disbanded July 27.

1889 Central Interstate League 
Davenport disbanded September 10.

1890 Central Interstate League 
(aka Western Inter-State League)
Galesburg (6–22) transferred to Indianapolis May 27; the franchise disbanded July 8. No playoffs were held.

References

Defunct minor baseball leagues in the United States
Baseball leagues in Illinois
Baseball leagues in Iowa
Baseball leagues in Indiana
Sports leagues established in 1888
Sports leagues disestablished in 1890